L. R. Shivarame Gowda (born 1 June 1956), is an Indian politician and chairman of Karnataka Federation Independent Schools Management. On 6 November 2018, he was elected as Member of Parliament from Mandya parliamentary constituency.

Personal life
Shivarame Gowda was born to Patel L. Ramegowda & Lakshmamma in Lalanakere, Nagamangala Mandya District. Shivarame Gowda was married to Sudha S. Gowda & has son & daughter Chetan Gowda & Bhavya Gowda.

Political career
In 1978 he entered into politics by becoming a member of TAPS. In 1984 he contested as independent candidate from Nagamangala Constituency. He also served as Chairman of Karnataka State Coir Development Corporation.

Positions held

References  

Indian chairpersons of corporations
21st-century Indian politicians
Living people
Janata Dal (Secular) politicians
Bharatiya Janata Party politicians from Karnataka
Biju Janata Dal politicians
1956 births